Zoltán Fábián (born 22 April 1969) is a male hammer thrower from Hungary. His personal best throw is 78.20 metres, achieved in June 1998 in Budapest.

He competed at the 1994 European Championships and the 1997 World Championships, but without reaching the final. He never became national champion; the competition from Tibor Gécsek, Balázs Kiss, Adrián Annus and Zsolt Németh was too strong, but he did win a bronze medal in 1994.

Continuing as a Masters athlete, he won the M45 division at the 2015 World Masters Athletics Championships.

Achievements

References

Hungarian male hammer throwers
1969 births
Living people
20th-century Hungarian people